The 1967–68 Swedish Division I season was the 24th season of Swedish Division I. Brynas IF won the league title by finishing first in the final round.

First round

Northern Group

Southern Group

Final round

External links
 1967–68 season

Swedish
Swedish Division I seasons
1967–68 in Swedish ice hockey